Kim Capri is a Vancouver, British Columbia, Canada city councillor who was elected as a member of Non-Partisan Association in 2005. She sought reelection in the 2008 Vancouver municipal election. As a city councillor, she has focused on reducing crime, reducing homelessness, and the local economy.

She was previously head of the Vancouver John Howard Society, and the Executive Director of the British Columbia Crime Prevention Association.  Kim Capri was also the Chief Operating Officer of the British Columbia Society for the Prevention of Cruelty to Animals. She has also worked as a parole officer, caseworker, and manager of halfway houses. She has a degree in criminology.

Capri became a director of MPA society, in charge of MPA resource centre and Sanford apartments; she stepped down from her role as a director of Court Advocacy and Hotel Outreach. 

She is married to a plastic surgeon in Vancouver; they have no children.

References

Living people
Non-Partisan Association councillors
Women municipal councillors in Canada
Women in British Columbia politics
Year of birth missing (living people)